Huamoé (Wamoe)  Uamué, Uman, or Atikum, is an extinct language of Brazil that is too poorly attested to classify. The Pankararú language is spoken just to the south.

It is also spelled Huamuê, Huamoi, Uame, Wamoé. Alternate names are Umã and Aticum (Atikum, Araticum).

Vocabulary

Loukotka (1968)
Loukotka (1968) lists the following basic vocabulary items for Umán.

{| class="wikitable"
! gloss !! Umán
|-
| man || porkia
|-
| sun || karí
|-
| moon || t'upañé
|-
| tobacco || kuprioː
|}

Pompeu (1958)
Language variety spoken by the Indians of the Serra Negra in Pernambuco, recorded in Brejo dos Padres:

{| class="wikitable sortable"
! Portuguese gloss (original) !! English gloss (translated) !! "Serra Negra"
|-
| sol || sun || kari
|-
| lua || moon || tyupanyé
|-
| trovão || thunder || traikozã
|-
| homem || man || porkiá
|-
| mulher || woman || sikiurú
|-
| macaco || monkey || arinã
|-
| cachorro || dog || sará
|-
| tatu-peba || six-banded armadillo (Euphractus sexcinctus) || tukuaranã
|-
| tatu-bola || Brazilian three-banded armadillo (Tolypeutes tricinctus) || kwaráu
|-
| tatu verdadeiro || nine-banded armadillo (Dasypus novemcinctus) || arikyó
|-
| tamanduá colete || southern tamandua (Tamandua tetradactyla) || muze káu káukrí
|-
| porco || pig || aleal
|-
| veado || deer || kwãú
|-
| gado vacum || cattle || kõnã
|-
| cavalo || horse || tyaparú
|-
| ema || rhea || lashikrá
|-
| tabaco, fumo || tobacco, smoke || kupriô
|-
| bom || good || niré
|-
| rancho || ranch || poró
|-
| branco || white || karikyá
|-
| negro || black || tapsishunã
|-
| mosca || fly || moka
|-
| vaca || cow || tyanã
|-
| bezerro || calf || tyapatã
|-
| Deus || God || panyé
|}

Meader (1978)
In 1961, three Aticum word lists were recorded by Menno Kroeker from three informants in Pernambuco State, and are published in Meader (1978). The lists are reproduced below, with English translations also given.

Word list recorded from Antônio Masio de Souza, a farmer from Carnaúba, Pernambuco:

{| class="wikitable sortable"
! Portuguese gloss (original) !! English gloss (translated) !! Aticum
|-
| fogo || fire || àtòˈé
|-
| pequena lagoa || small pond || kàtìšὶdὶnὶ
|-
| mãe || mother || sih / æ̀ntὶsὶdὶnˈómà
|-
| pai || father || æ̀ntὶsὶdὶnˈómù
|-
| banana || banana || pàkˈóà
|-
| batata || potato || zítírə̃̀nˈí
|-
| cavalo || horse || kə̃̀naùrùˈí
|-
| deus || God || tùpˈə̃̀
|-
| ladrão || thief || lˈáklì də̃̀nkùrˈí
|-
| negro do cabelo duro || hard black hair || màkˈétò pìàkˈá
|-
| sem-vergonha || shameless || sˈέklì vlˈέklì kə̃̀nkùrˈí
|}

Word list recorded from Pedro José Tiatoni, a wandering pajé (shaman) from Jatobá, Pernambuco (near Maniçobal):

{| class="wikitable sortable"
! Portuguese gloss (original) !! English gloss (translated) !! Aticum
|-
| amigo || friend || méˈὲlì
|-
| bolha d'água || water bubble || boiI dˈægwai
|-
| casar-se || marry || kã̀zˈuUtĩ
|-
| cego || blind || sὲdˈíntú
|-
| cérebro || brain || ὲsὲloˈú bàiὲ
|-
| chefe || chief || šeEfˈuUte
|-
| cicatriz || scar || sìkˈéιtæ̀ù
|-
| corcovado || humped || kɔ́Ɔkɔ̀rˈítìvá
|-
| corpo || body || èžóːO kóOpítˈĩ̀
|-
| cotovelo || elbow || šὲkítˈũ̀và
|-
| dedo || finger || dὲényˈò
|-
| doente || sick || déˈósìtə̃́
|-
| doer || to hurt, be in pain || dòέkátˈũ̀
|-
| garganta || throat || gàrgὲlˈí
|-
| gêmeos || twins || zéὲˈéEtìò
|-
| inimigo || enemy || ínˈίƖsì
|-
| médico || doctor || météòhˈὲtù
|-
| muco || mucus || bὲtˈṍkyà
|-
| nuca || nape || sṹkˈè kɔ̀tì
|-
| ombro || shoulder || álíˈɔ́kà
|-
| patrão || master, boss || péEtɔi
|-
| pulso || pulse || sὲóːspˈóːpə̀
|-
| punho || fist || pὲóOtˈə̃̀
|-
| pus || pus || pe
|-
| queixo || chin || séikítˈὲ šĩ̀
|-
| remédio || medicine || rèmèzˈítíò
|-
| rosto || face || làbàtˈíš tὲˈíštú
|-
| surdo || deaf || sùUtˈέlì
|-
| testa || forehead || tˈúmàžĩ́nὲtà
|-
| tossir || cough || tˈóːmɔ̀štìà
|-
| tumor || tumor || túmˈàžù
|-
| varíola || smallpox || vȁréʔˈὲlì
|-
| veia || vein || vέlˈùUsí
|-
| verruga || wart || gˈaAgoleE
|}

Word list recorded from Luís Baldo, a wandering pajé (shaman) from near Cachoeirinha, Pernambuco:

{| class="wikitable sortable"
! Portuguese gloss (original) !! English gloss (translated) !! Aticum
|-
| água || water || žεntˈura
|-
| árvore (genérico) || tree (generic) || selˈa
|-
| árvore (musame) || tree (musame) || žˈatoe
|-
| árvore (um tipo) || tree (type of) || aparεšiˈũ
|-
| cabeça || head || nˈuvi
|-
| casa || house || zə̃ŋgˈada, ohə̃šˈaria
|-
| cobra || snake || sarapˈɔ
|-
| fogo || fire || ˈošu
|-
| fumo || smoke || pakˈaso
|-
| furar / buraco || to drill / hole || žudˈaku
|-
| lavar-se || wash oneself || žodˈaxsi
|-
| limpo || clean || žˈinto
|-
| mão || hand || žə̃nˈu
|-
| nuvem || cloud || žˈúnúpà
|-
| orelha || ear || ukˈə̃
|-
| panela || pan || sə̃nˈεla
|-
| peixe || fish || useštiãˈõ
|-
| (piolho) || (louse) || žirˈuda
|-
| rir || laugh || xˈika
|-
| sol || sun || patupˈə̃
|-
| o sol está quente || The sun is hot. || o so ʌta kˈə̃ta
|-
| acender || light up || æžudˈea
|-
| acordar-se || wake up || axšodˈaːši
|-
| algodão || cotton || kapušˈu
|-
| alegre || happy || gˈεgi
|-
| aldeia || village || žˈə̃ndũ
|-
| amargo || bitter || ažˈaxku
|-
| apagar || turn off || ašotˈa
|-
| arbusto || bush || žˈota
|-
| azedo || sour || aAsˈedu
|-
| balde || bucket || εlˈagi
|-
| banana || banana || ə̃nə̃nˈa
|-
| barranco || ravine || sahˈə̃ŋku
|-
| batata || potato || šˈə̃milya
|-
| bode || goat || tˈoda
|-
| bolsa || bag || zˈoOsa
|-
| brando || mild || žˈandu
|-
| cachaça || cachaça || kə̃mbˈumba
|-
| cachorro || dog || tašˈoku
|-
| cadeira || chair || sadeˈira
|-
| caixa || box || šekˈə̃
|-
| cama || bed || sˈəma
|-
| cansado || tired || sˈadu
|-
| carriça || wren || sumˈiga
|-
| cego || blind || sˈεsa
|-
| cerca || fence || sˈeːkə
|-
| cesta || basket || εsestaˈũgũ
|-
| chorar || cry || šˈuga
|-
| cobertor || blanket || zˈidyo
|-
| colher || spoon || æžilˈεka, šulˈεka
|-
| cova || grave || šˈɔda
|-
| cru || crude || tu
|-
| cuia || cuia || εšˈuia
|-
| dedo || finger || dˈedo
|-
| doce || sweet || dˈota
|-
| doente || sick || žinˈεti
|-
| duro || hard || ažˈuru, sˈasu
|-
| encanamento || plumbing || žedˈə̃
|-
| engolir || swallow || gˈui
|-
| escada || ladder || žikˈada
|-
| espinho || thorn || žõŋgaˈiža
|-
| esteira || mat || bešteˈira
|-
| estrangeiro || stranger, foreigner || žˈĩžeiro
|-
| feijão || bean || seižˈãõ
|-
| fósforo || match (lighter) || sˈɔˑstu
|-
| gato || cat || tˈata
|-
| gêmeos || twins || žεni
|-
| gritar || shout || ˈita
|-
| ilha || island || ˈida
|-
| os índios || Indians || nus dí žˈíŋgàʔ šú
|-
| Jânio Quadros || Jânio Quadros || uz ˈondios
|-
| Japão || Japan || o zˈiru cə̃ntalˈεros
|-
| jarro || jug || lˈažo
|-
| lã || there || osˈõndia
|-
| lagarto preto || black lizard || žakobˈebo
|-
| lama || mud || cˈə̃ntara
|-
| ligeiro || light || varˈeru
|-
| linha || line || diŋaz
|-
| mal || bad || zau
|-
| médico || doctor || žˈedigu
|-
| mesa || table || zˈeza
|-
| morcego || bat || sosˈegu
|-
| onça || jaguar || dˈõnsa
|-
| parede || wall || degˈedi
|-
| peneira || sieve || seneˈira
|-
| penha || cliff || šˈẽñã
|-
| ponte || bridge || tˈeasiŋ, sˈõnti, gražˈuris
|-
| prato || plate || šˈatu
|-
| primeiro || first || temˈedo
|-
| pulso || pulse || žˈεdigo
|-
| punho || fist || tˈuŋa
|-
| querer || want || seˑrˈea
|-
| rede || net || ˈedõ
|-
| remédio || medicine || žegˈεdu
|-
| sabão || soap || šodˈãõ
|-
| sibilar || hiss || klˈika
|-
| suar || to sweat || ašugˈaxša
|-
| tatu || armadillo || takˈu
|-
| tear || loom || žˈeda
|-
| tecido || fabric || osˈedãõ
|-
| terremoto || earthquake || gə̃mˈɔta
|-
| testa || forehead || tˈεεka
|-
| teto || ceiling || ketˈu
|-
| tossir || to cough || sˈɔta
|-
| triste || sad || kˈesti
|-
| tronco || trunk || sidˈə̃
|-
| último || last, final || žˈitimu
|-
| urso || bear (animal) || ˈuta
|-
| urubu || vulture || ukəŋgˈu
|-
| varíola || smallpox || zˈεriola
|-
| vassoura || broom || barsoˈura
|-
| vazio || empty || žˈažiu
|-
| vela || candle || drˈεzba
|-
| verruga || wart || šə̃šugˈati
|-
| viga || beam || dˈigũ
|}

References

Alain Fabre, 2005, Diccionario etnolingüístico y guía bibliográfica de los pueblos indígenas sudamericanos: ATIKUM/UAMUÉ

Extinct languages of South America
Unclassified languages of South America
Indigenous languages of Northeastern Brazil